Charles Melville McLaren, 3rd Baron Aberconway,  (16 April 1913 – 4 February 2003) was a British industrialist and horticulturalist. He was the son of Henry McLaren, 2nd Baron Aberconway, and Christabel Macnaghten.he died in 2003

Education
He was educated at Eton and New College, Oxford, and became a barrister of the Middle Temple.

Career

As a young man, he became a director of John Brown & Company, where his father was chairman.  Due to this connection, he took part in the secret, unofficial meeting of British businessmen with Hermann Göring arranged by Birger Dahlerus in August 1939 as a last-ditch effort to forestall war.

During the Second World War, he served in the Royal Artillery, becoming a second lieutenant. After the war, he took a more active role in the family corporations, preparing to succeed his father. He was also a director of Westland Aircraft from 1947 to 1985. He was made a Justice of the Peace for Denbighshire in 1946, and High Sheriff of Denbighshire in 1950.

In 1953, he succeeded his father in the barony, the chairmanship of John Brown and English China Clays, and various other industrial interests. He continued in these chairmanships until 1986 and 1984, respectively. Despite his corporate responsibilities, Lord Aberconway took a keen interest in horticulture. Besides maintaining the family's Bodnant Garden, he was the President of the Royal Horticultural Society from 1961 to 1983 and oversaw the management of the Chelsea Flower Show. His annual assertion became famous:

Despite inheriting a seat in the House of Lords, he rarely attended. Throughout his life, he enjoyed writing pithy, memorable and topical letters to The Times. He is buried at the mausoleum called "The Poem" within Bodnant Garden, the traditional burial place of the Lords Aberconway.

Family
He married Deirdre Knewstub, daughter of John Knewstub, on 6 December 1941, and had three children:
Julia Harriet McLaren (b. 22 September 1942), married Capt. Charles Ridley and has issue
Dr Caroline Mary McLaren (b. 24 October 1944), married Raimund Sargent and has issue
Henry Charles McLaren, 4th Baron Aberconway (b. 1948)

The couple divorced in 1949, and he married Ann Bullard (née Aymer, mother of the Countess of Onslow)   the same year. They had one son:
Michael Duncan McLaren, KC (b. 29 November 1958), married Caroline Stacey and has issue; present manager of Bodnant Garden.

References
 Who Was Who, A & C Black, 1920–2007; online edn, Oxford University Press, December 2007

External links
 thePeerage.com
 

1913 births
2003 deaths
Alumni of New College, Oxford
3
People educated at Eton College
Victoria Medal of Honour recipients
High Sheriffs of Denbighshire
Royal Artillery officers
British Army personnel of World War II
English justices of the peace
Charles
Aberconway